Remi Barry (born August 27, 1991) is a French professional basketball player who lastly played for the Monaco Basket of the LNB Pro A.

Professional career 
On January 23, 2018, he signed with Croatian basketball club Jazine.

References

External links 
 at aba-liga.com
 at Eurobasket.com
 at RealGM
 at DraftExpress
 at CBS Sports
 at ScoutBasketball
 ESPN

1991 births
Living people
AS Monaco Basket players
Ehime Orange Vikings players
French men's basketball players
JA Vichy players
Poitiers Basket 86 players
Small forwards
STB Le Havre players
KK Jazine Arbanasi players